Federal Highway 103 (Carretera Federal 103) is a Federal Highway of Mexico. The highway connects Michapa, Morelos at Mexican Federal Highway 166 in the north to Amacuzac, Morelos at Mexican Federal Highway 95 in the south.

References

103